Trezzini family of Italian-speaking natives of Astano, canton of Ticino, Switzerland produced architects, notable for their work in Russia in the 18th century. Trezzini were nobles, with a properly chartered coat of arms. The identity of some Trezzinis  and relationships between them is disputable.

 Domenico Giovanni Trezzini (1670, Astano - 1734 Saint Petersburg), also russified to Andrey Yakimovich Trezin or Andrey Petrovich Trezin, was the first Ticino architect to settle in Russia, notable for development of Petrine Baroque and building Saint Petersburg's first stone structures. He was married three times, which explains vast differences in birth years of his children and confusion among their relationship (see below).
 Pietro Trezzini (1710, Astano - 1734, Astano), son of Domenico Giovanni Trezzini, left Russia in 1725. He is sometimes confused with architect Pietro Trezzini, but, most likely, they are two distinct personalities
 Matteo Trezzini (after 1710 - after 1750), russified to Matvey Andreevich Trezzini, another son of Domenico Giovanni Trezzini, returned to Saint Petersburg after his father's death, and practiced medicine (according to Russian archives).
 Carlo Giuseppe Trezzini (1697, Astano - 1768, Saint Petersburg), russified to Osip Petrovich Trezzini, was an architect married to Domenico Trezzini's daughter, Maria Lucia Tomasina Trezzini. His architectural input is proven only in Saint Petersburg's Twelve Colleges Building, however, he probably was a very capable construction manager. He is credited with inviting other Ticino and Lugano families to Saint Petersburg.
 Pietro Antonio Trezzini (? - 1759), russified as Pyotr Trezin, also an architect, has worked with Domenico Trezzini. He is, most likely, not Domenico's son. Pietro Trezzini is credited with Baroque buildings in Saint Petersburg and St. Clement's Church in Moscow.
 Giuseppe Trezzini (1732, Astano - 1785, Lugano), was an architect in Saint Peterburg

References
English: Swiss Architects in Saint Petersburg, 
Russian: Леман, Е., "Архитектор Доменико Трезини и его потомки в России", www.vgd.ru

People from Ticino